The Cane Hill Cemetery is a cemetery in Canehill, Arkansas.  It is located just south of Washington County Route 13 and west of Arkansas Highway 45.

History
The Cane Hill area was settled in the late 1820s.  The cemetery contains the graves of two of its first settlers, Thomas Garvin (d. 1834) and Thomas Buchanan (d. 1836), and is the site of the community's first church and schoolhouse.  The Cane Hill area was the site of the Battle of Cane Hill, a running battle fought a few days before the Battle of Prairie Grove in November 1862. James G. Blunt and his Union troops captured approximately 2,000 Confederate soldiers in November 1862. The cemetery contains many Civil War-era burials.

The cemetery was listed on the National Register of Historic Places in 1982.

See also
 National Register of Historic Places listings in Washington County, Arkansas

References

External links
 

Cemeteries on the National Register of Historic Places in Arkansas
Protected areas of Washington County, Arkansas
1834 establishments in Arkansas Territory
National Register of Historic Places in Washington County, Arkansas
Cemeteries established in the 1830s